Hobbe Smith (7 December 1862, Witmarsum – 1 May 1942, Amsterdam) was a Dutch painter, watercolorist and graphic designer, in the Post-Impressionist style.

Biography 
His father was a house painter and he was apprenticed to a lithographer at a young age. He attended the Rijksakademie van beeldende kunsten, the Tekenacademie (Antwerpen), and the Quellinusschool.

Thanks to a wealthy patron who liked his work, he was able to receive a Royal Scholarship and studied at the Rijksakademie with  August Allebé. Later, he took classes at the Royal Academy of Fine Arts in Antwerp with Charles Verlat.

He painted a wide variety of subjects, including nudes, still lifes, portraits, historical scenes and seascapes, influenced by Jacob Maris. In 1888, he won the Willink van Collenprijs. International fame arrived after an exhibition at the Pulchri Studio in 1902. He received a gold medal from Queen Wilhelmina in 1917. He was also a member of Arti et Amicitiae.

Smith's work was included in the 1939 exhibition and sale Onze Kunst van Heden (Our Art of Today) at the Rijksmuseum in Amsterdam.

References

Further reading 
 Norbert Middelkoop, Gezicht op het IJ: Hobbe Smith en de Amsterdamse haven in 1913, Amsterdam Museum, 2013

External links 

ArtNet: More works by Smith.

1862 births
1942 deaths
19th-century Dutch painters
Dutch male painters
20th-century Dutch painters
Dutch watercolourists
Dutch Impressionist painters
Dutch marine artists
People from Wûnseradiel
19th-century Dutch male artists
20th-century Dutch male artists